Fertőd is a town in the Győr-Moson-Sopron county of Hungary, not far from Austria. Fertőd was formed when the towns of Eszterháza and Süttör were unified, in 1950.

It is the location of one of Hungary's best known palaces, Eszterháza, which was built in the 1760s by Prince Prince Nikolaus I Esterházy of the influential Esterházy family.

Prince Nikolaus IV Esterházy († 1920), his wife Margit († 1910), their son Anton († 1944) and other family members are buried in the Esterházy family cemetery in Fertőd, which is located in a small park around two kilometers northeast of the Eszterháza Palace.

Twin towns — sister cities
Fertőd is twinned with:

  Millingen aan de Rijn, Netherlands

References

External links

 Official site 
 Street map 
Aerial photographs

Populated places in Győr-Moson-Sopron County
Esterházy family
Palaces in Hungary